Alessandro Preziosi (born 19 April 1973) is an Italian actor.

Biography
Son of lawyers, Preziosi was born and raised in Avellino, Italy, later moving to nearby Vomero, Naples. He completed his classical studies at the Liceo Umberto I of Naples, graduated in law from the University Federico II of Naples (with the maximum of the votes) and became assistant in tax law at the University of Salerno, later attending the Academy of Amateur Dramatics of Milan.  He was noticed by director Antonio Calenda who cast him in role of Laertes in Hamlet.

He subsequently worked on thetelevision soap opera of Channel 5, Vivere and in the TV miniseries Una donna per amico (TV series) by Rossella Izzo, but continued his theatrical work, realizing the monologue The last hours of AI with his friend Tommaso Mattei, with whom he later began a production partnership, creating the Khora Theatre company. Later he left the soap opera, reads in Trilogy by Aeschylus, also directed by Calenda, in Herald garments in Agamemnon and Orestes in The Libation Bearers and Eumenides, receiving critical acclaim.

But the popularity arrives with Elisa di Rivombrosa, television series Cinzia TH Torrini, transmitted between December 2003 and February 2004 by Canale 5 (an italian Network), thanks to the great success which won the Telegatto as a male character of the year in the role of Earl Fabrizio Ristori. In the second season it is present only in the first two episodes, having chosen to rededicate themselves to the theater with King Lear, directed by Calenda, is role, is that of Edmund, followed by the musical comedy Datemi tre caravelle (Give me three caravels), the original production of Khora Theatre, in which she plays Christopher Columbus, a role that will come back to play in subsequent performances of 2005 and 2006.

After the short movie of 2001 dedicated by director Giorgio Reale Scieri to the case, in 2004 is the protagonist of his first film for the film Vanilla and chocolate Ciro Ippolito, and the television miniseries in six episodes of Captain Vittorio Sindoni, broadcast by RAI 2 ; in the second season, which aired in 2007, it is present only in the first two episodes.

In 2007 he appears on the big screen in the film The Viceroys by Roberto Faenza, and The Lark, by Paolo and Vittorio Taviani. In September, it is called to participate as the narrator, along with Giannini, Guaccero and Fulco, event The Agora night on the esplanade of the Shrine of Loreto, the first youth meeting with Pope Benedict XVI.

In 2008 he returned to television on Rai Uno with Commissioner De Luca, 4 TV movie, taken from the novel by Carlo Lucarelli, directed by Antonio Frazzi. Commissioner De Luca, work of high quality standards, the Italian Kineo receives award for best television film at the Venice Film Festival 2008 and the great international prize of Agrigento Efebo D'Oro for Best TV adaptation of a literary text, while Alessandro Preziosi is assigned Efebo D'Argento for "masterful interpretation". With this realization, the actor also won the international award Golden Chest, with director Antonio Frazzi.

Also in 2008, is a producer and performer of two theater events: the melodrama The Bridge, written by Pennisi with music by Di Battista, and Hamlet, reducing the homonymous tragedy of Shakespeare texts by Eugenio Montale. The melodrama, through the anxieties of a simple worker, brings to life the history and stories of the South; which premiered in May in Rome on the occasion of Labor and Creativity Workshop in September is proposed in Reggio Calabria between the appointments of the Seventh International Architecture Laboratory. The Hamlet directed by Armando Pugliese debuts in July at the Roman Theatre in Verona, the first stage of un'applaudita summer tour. On the occasion of "La Versiliana", crowning a commitment in the theater, he was awarded the Golden Talent in the first edition of the Franco Martini Prize: a theater a lifetime.

On the film front, Preziosi is among the interpreters of the film The blood of the vanquished, based on the controversial historical essay by Giampaolo Pansa, directed by Michele Soavi, with Michele Placido protagonist. The film was presented as a special event in October 2008 at the Rome Film Festival.

The Hamlet with Preziosi and a company of actors, both young and long career, is successfully represented during a double tour (seasons 2008/2009 and 2009/2010) which reaches theaters in 50 Italian cities and towns. In summer 2009, confirming the continuing support of civic and cultural values, the theatrical production company Khora.Teatro - founded in 2004 by Alessandro Preziosi and Tommaso Mattei Aldo Allegrini - care of the production and participate as an actor in the video of the show " the Taste of Ashes "by Ariel Dorfman, directed by Juan Diego Puerta Lopez, inspired by the book by Kerry Kennedy" Speak truth to power "with a special appearance in the video Piera Degli Esposti, Enrico Lo Verso, sponsored by the Robert F. Kennedy Foundation of Europe Onlus in coproduction with Khora Theatre and the Museum of Contemporary Art "Luigi Pecci" (Prato). Inaugurated the Shakespearean Festival of Verona 09 with an innovative Twelfth Night, in which Luca De Filippo directed by Armando Pugliese tries his hand for the first time with the Great Bard.

In September 2009 Preziosi plays in Mine Vaganti, award-winning comedy set in Salento with Riccardo Scamarcio and Ennio Fantastichini, directed by Ferzan Ozpetek, in theaters in March 2010 (English: Loose Cannons). In January 2010, he plays St. Augustine in the miniseries of Lux Vide directed by Christian Duguay, followed on raiuno by an average of 7 million viewers. In the same year he joined the cast of the new work by Fausto Brizzi: double Males film against females and males against females. Also in 2010, thanks to the intensity of his Hamlet, Alessandro Preziosi received the prestigious Premio Gassman - Teatranti year, the only Italian theatrical award where the public to give the awards to distinguished artists on the stage. In 2011 shooting a TV series for Channel 5 entitled A love and revenge, directed by Raffaele Mertes in the role of the mysterious entrepreneur Lorenzo Bermann, and is on the film set as the protagonist, along with Chiatti, the art film The face of another Pappi Corsica, presented at the Rome film Festival in 2012 and will be released in theaters in 2013, the same year that the film comes out Left Passion of Marco Ponti, in which he stars opposite Preziosi Lodovini, Riccobono and Marchionni.

Meanwhile the artist works as Programs Leader DAMS Link Academy - European Academy of Dramatic Arts in Rome and, since 2011, for three years he was Artistic Director of the Teatro Stabile of Abruzzo. In the period of Aquila, the promoter of the imaginary Shipyards, processes and assists three shows-lab / event: Troilus and Cressida (Wounded Eagle), A Midsummer Night's Dream (the dream of recovering the City) and Odyssey (return the exiles to the City). The cooperation of TSA and Khora.Teatro born Cyrano de Bergerac starring and directed by Preziosi, who in two seasons of replicas (2012/2013 and 2013/2014) broad support of the public and critics. In 2014 the artist carefully and interprets the monologue Cyrano on the moon that will be awarded the Golden Mask of the Italian theater.

For RAI Fiction, plays the judge Sossi in 70 years Trilogy by Graziano Diana (2012), starred in Lucky Italo German TV movie My lovely Italian family of Olaf Kreinsen (2013) and in the miniseries For love of my people - Diana Don Antonio Frazzi, in memory of the heroic priest of Casal di Principe (2013). The delicate and sensitive rendering of the role earned him awards and critical accolades. Also in 2013, Lux Vide plays a retelling of the fairy tale Beauty and the Beast, directed by Fabrizio Costa, which will give the RAI in the 2014 holiday season a great success in terms of audience and interest on social media.

Other 2013/2014 projects include participation in a US film 'indie', Voice Over work in commercials and movies, the recording of the readings from the masterpiece by Agostino da Tagaste for the CD included in the book The Confessions of St. Augustine, published by New cities, and collaboration with the writer Erri De Luca for the project the Music Proven, published by Feltrinelli.

Called to serve on the Jury of the National Theatre Prize Luigi Pirandello (2013/2014), even in the theatrical season 2014/2015 Preziosi puts its expertise at the service of the stage, setting up as a director and performer refined Don Juan by Moliere, product by TSA and Khora.Teatro with Nando Paone in the role of Sganarelle and original music by Andrea Parri.

He has two children: Andrea Eduardo (1995) was born from the relationship with Rossella Zito and Elena (2006) by the relationship with Vittoria Puccini.

In 2016 he played Filippo Brunelleschi in the tv series Medici: Masters of Florence, also with Dustin Hoffman and Richard Madden.

Filmography

Films

Television

External links

 

1973 births
Living people
Male actors from Naples
Italian male television actors
Italian male film actors
20th-century Italian male actors
21st-century Italian male actors